LinuxUser is a German computer magazine for Linux users published by German media company Medialinx AG. It was first published in 2000.

References

External links
 

2000 establishments in Germany
Computer magazines published in Germany
German-language magazines
Linux magazines
Magazines established in 2000
Magazines published in Munich
Monthly magazines published in Germany